Furostilbestrol (INN), also known as diethylstilbestrol di(2-furoate) or simply as diesthylstilbestrol difuroate, is a synthetic, nonsteroidal estrogen of the stilbestrol group related to diethylstilbestrol that was never marketed. It is an ester of diethylstilbestrol and was described in the literature in 1952.

See also
 Diethylstilbestrol dipropionate
 Dimestrol
 Fosfestrol
 Mestilbol

References

Estrogen esters
Phenols
Stilbenoids
Synthetic estrogens
Abandoned drugs